Jonas Søgaard Mortensen (born 17 January 2001) is a Danish professional footballer who plays for Danish 1st Division club Esbjerg fB.

Club career
In 2012, Mortensen joined Esbjerg fB from Varde IF at the age of 13. In December 2016, Mortensen signed a three-year youth contract with the club. Already at the age of 16, Mortensen was a starter for the U19 squad.

Mortensen made his competitive debut for Esbjerg on 27 February 2019 against OB, playing 98 minutes of the Danish Cup quarter-final, which Esbjerg lost 5–4 after penalties. He made his league debut the following month, coming off the bench for Carlo Holse deep into injury time in a 2–1 victory against Vejle in the Danish Superliga.

Ahead of the 2019–20 pre-season, Mortensen was permanently promoted into the first team squad.

International career
Mortensen made his debut for Denmark under-16s on 21 May 2017, coming on as a substitute in a 1–1 UEFA Development Tournament draw against Kosovo. He made his first appearance at under-17 level in January 2018, playing in a 3–2 friendly win against Cyprus U17. He would go on to make three total appearances for the U17 team. On 13 January 2019, Mortensen made his debut for the under-19 team in a 1–1 friendly draw against Israel U19, playing the second half instead of Japhet Sery Larsen. He would go on to make 10 total appearances for the under-19 team.

References

External links
Jonas Mortensen at Esbjerg fB's website
Jonas Mortensen at DBU

2001 births
Living people
Danish men's footballers
Denmark youth international footballers
Danish Superliga players
Danish 1st Division players
Varde IF players
Esbjerg fB players
Association football defenders